Prof. Vagif Guliyev is an Azerbaijani mathematician. He was born in Salyan district of Azerbaijan republic, USSR. He has earned Doctor of Sciences Degree from Steklov Institute of Mathematics, Moscow in 1994. He has written three books and more than 100 published articles. He is a full professor at Baku State University.

Research area 

His research interests are:
 Potential type operators on Lie groups or homogeneous spaces
 Singular integral operators on Lie groups or homogeneous spaces
 Function spaces on Lie groups or homogeneous spaces
 Banach-valued function spaces of fractional smoothness
 Integral operators on strictly pseudo-convex domains in Cn
 Function spaces on strictly pseudo-convex domains in Cn
 Solvability and other properties of invariant partial differential equations on Lie groups
 Singular integrals, maximal functions and other integral operators, generated by Bessel differential operators
 Bessel harmonic analysis and applications

External links
Vagif Guliyev's personal website
List of published articles

1957 births
Living people
20th-century Azerbaijani mathematicians
Academic staff of Baku State University
People from Salyan, Azerbaijan
21st-century Azerbaijani mathematicians